Ian Llord (born June 9, 1985, in St. Catharines, Ontario) is a professional lacrosse player who plays for the Philadelphia Wings of the National Lacrosse League and the Six Nations Chiefs of Major Series Lacrosse.

Canadian box career

Junior
Llord played for the St. Catharines Athletics of the Ontario Junior A Lacrosse League. In 2003, he would help the team to their second Minto Cup in three years.

Senior
Llord was selected 1st Overall in the 2007 Major Series Lacrosse draft by the Brampton Excelsiors. During his rookie season, the Excelsiors won the Mann Cup.

In 2013, Llord split time between the Six Nations Chiefs of Major Series Lacrosse and the St. Catharines Saints of the Ontario Lacrosse Association Senior B Lacrosse League. He appeared in both regular season and playoff games for both teams. The Chiefs won the Mann Cup, and the Saints won the Presidents Cup.

National Lacrosse League career
Llord was originally drafted by the Bandits in the fourth round (42nd overall) of the 2005 NLL Entry Draft. Unsigned by the Bandits, Llord would re-enter the Draft the following year where he was taken in the first round draft (5th overall) by the Philadelphia Wings.  He was awarded Rookie of the Week honours in Week 7 of the 2007 season.

Following the 2007 season, Llord was traded to the Calgary Roughnecks in a three-way trade.  Llord was then traded to the Buffalo Bandits during the 2007 NLL Entry Draft.

Llord was a member of the 2008 NLL Champion Buffalo Bandits, 2013 and 2014 NLL Champion Rochester Knighthawks.

Statistics

National Lacrosse League
Reference:

Canadian Lacrosse Association

References

1985 births
Living people
Buffalo Bandits players
Canadian lacrosse players
Lacrosse people from Ontario
Philadelphia Wings players
Sportspeople from St. Catharines